The South Mountain Iron Company was the owner of the Pine Grove Furnace in Cumberland County, Pennsylvania, along South Mountain after the 1864 $1,500,000 purchase from Jay Cooke & Company.  In 1877 the company was split into separate mining and railway companies, with the latter South Mountain Railway and Mining Company establishing the 1884 South Mountain Railroad between the Pine Grove Iron Works and the Cumberland Valley Railroad's Carlisle Junction then being purchased by the 1891 Gettysburg and Harrisburg Railway company.  The real estate of the 1877 South Mountain Mining and Iron Company is now the Pine Grove Furnace State Park and Michaux State Forest after being sold to the Pennsylvania Department of Forestry in 1912-3.

References

Defunct mining companies of the United States
Defunct companies based in Pennsylvania
History of Cumberland County, Pennsylvania
Ironworks and steel mills in Pennsylvania
South Mountain Range (Maryland−Pennsylvania)
American companies established in 1865

Non-renewable resource companies disestablished in 1913

1865 disestablishments in Pennsylvania
1913 disestablishments in Pennsylvania
Non-renewable resource companies established in 1865